Judit Kiss-Gerhardt (1 February 1941 – 21 December 2003) was a Hungarian volleyball player. She competed in the women's tournament at the 1972 Summer Olympics.

References

External links
 

1941 births
2003 deaths
Hungarian women's volleyball players
Olympic volleyball players of Hungary
Volleyball players at the 1972 Summer Olympics
Sportspeople from Bács-Kiskun County